There are 461 properties and historic districts listed on the National Register of Historic Places in North Dakota. There are listings in 52 of North Dakota's 53 counties.



Current listings by county

The following are approximate tallies of current listings by county. These counts are based on entries in the National Register Information Database as of April 24, 2008 and new weekly listings posted since then on the National Register of Historic Places web site. There are frequent additions to the listings and occasional delistings and the counts here are approximate and not official. New entries are added to the official Register on a weekly basis.  Also, the counts in this table exclude boundary increase and decrease listings which modify the area covered by an existing property or district and which carry a separate National Register reference number. The numbers of NRHP listings in each county are documented by tables in each of the individual county list-articles.

Adams County

|}

Barnes County

Benson County

|}

Billings County

|}

Bottineau County

|}

Bowman County

|}

Burke County

|}

Former listing

|}

Burleigh County

Cass County

Cavalier County

|}

Dickey County

|}

Divide County

|}

Dunn County

|}

Former listing 

|}

Eddy County

|}

Former listing 

|}

Emmons County

Foster County

|}

Former listing

|}

Golden Valley County

|}

Grand Forks County

Grant County

|}

Griggs County

|}

Hettinger County

|}

Kidder County

|}

LaMoure County

|}

Former listing

|}

Logan County

|}

McHenry County

McIntosh County

|}

Former listing 

|}

McKenzie County

|}

McLean County

|}

Former listings

|}

Mercer County

|}

Former listing

|}

Morton County

|}

Former listing

|}

Mountrail County

|}

Nelson County

|}

Oliver County

|}

Pembina County

Pierce County

|}

Ramsey County

Ransom County

|}

Renville County

|}

Richland County

Rolette County

|}

Sargent County

|}

Sheridan County

|}

Former listing 

|}

Sioux County

Sioux County has no current listings on the National Register.

Former listing 

|}

Slope County

|}

Former listing

|}

Stark County

|}

Former listing 

|}

Steele County

|}

Stutsman County

Towner County

|}

Traill County

Walsh County

Ward County

Wells County

|}

Williams County

|}

See also
List of National Historic Landmarks in North Dakota
List of bridges on the National Register of Historic Places in North Dakota

References

 
North Dakota